Adana is an Indian raga. It is also called Adana Kanada. It is often sung or played in drut laya after a vilambit composition in raga Darbari Kanada, as Adana is straighter than Darbari in its chalan, thus allowing faster passages. The flow of this raga is similar to a mix of Madhyamad Saranga with Darbari. Another common vivadi some artists use sparingly is shuddha ni which enhances the Saranga mood of the raga.

Aroha and avaroha

Arohana: 

Avarohana:

Vadi and samavadi
 Vadi : Sa
 Samvadi : Pa

Organization and relationships
Flat Ga is usually omitted in ascent and in descent always appears in the distinctive Kanada phrase g m R S. Flat Dha is present in descent, but one should never linger on it. In fact it is omitted by some musicians completely. Most movements are in the upper tetrachord, around high Sa. It is very common to begin the elaboration of this raga with high Sa.

Adana is part of the Kanada Raga group.

Samay (Time)
Late Night (12am-3am)

Historical Information
Ādāna was previously called Āḍḍānā.

Adana was a major raga in the 17th century and a combination of the then current ragas Malhar and Kanada. In a ragamala painting from Mewar it is depicted as an ascetic man sitting on a tiger skin, however, Somnath describes him as Kama the god of love. His Adana was quite different from the raga as it is performed today.

Origins

Important Recordings
Singh Bandhu, "Taan Kaptaan"

References

External links 
Film Songs in Rag Adana

Literature
(most) entries due to:

Hindustani ragas